Artane Rizvanolli (born 7 May 1984) is a Kosovar Albanian economist, currently serving as minister of economy of the Republic of Kosovo.

Rizvanolli completed her bachelor's degree in economics at the University of Prishtina. She then obtained her master's in economics for business analysis from Staffordshire University in the United Kingdom. She received her PhD in economics from Staffordshire University in 2012 with a dissertation on the link between human capital and foreign direct investment in European economies in transition.

She worked as a researcher at the Riinvest Institute in Prishtina for six years and later served as a researcher and policy advisor for domestic and international organizations. Her areas of focus included employment, private sector development, the diaspora, and public finances. She has been a lecturer at Riinvest College since 2007.

On 22 March 2021, Rizvanolli was appointed minister of economy in the second Kurti government. Her portfolio covers energy, mining, publicly owned enterprises, and ICT.

Rizvanolli has authored several policy papers and scholarly articles published in international journals.
 
In addition to her native Albanian, she speaks English and Serbian. She is married with one child.

References

Kosovo Albanians
1984 births
Living people
Kosovan economists
University of Pristina alumni
Alumni of Staffordshire University
Women government ministers of Kosovo
Economy ministers of Kosovo